Absent Without Leave is a 1992 New Zealand drama film directed by John Laing and starring Craig McLachlan. It was entered into the 18th Moscow International Film Festival.

Cast
 Craig McLachlan as James Edwards
 Katrina Hobbs as Daisy Edwards
 Judie Douglass as Ella
 Tony Barry as Peter
 Ken Blackburn as C.O.
 Tony Burton as Constable
 Francis Bell as Paddy
 Robyn Malcolm as Betty
 David Copeland as Claude
 Desmond Kelly as Daisy's Father
 Rebecca Hobbs as Daisy's Sister
 William Kircher as Sergeant Major

References

External links
 
Absent Without Leave (1993) at New Zealand Feature Film Database

1992 films
1990s New Zealand films
1992 drama films
New Zealand drama films
1990s English-language films
Films directed by John Laing